Torgny Mogren (born 26 July 1963) is a Swedish former cross-country skier who competed from 1984 to 1998. He won the gold medal in the 4 × 10 km relay at the 1988 Winter Olympics in Calgary. His best individual finish was a fifth in the combined pursuit at the 1992 Winter Olympics in Albertville.

Mogren's biggest successes occurred at the FIS Nordic World Ski Championships where he earned nine medals. This included four golds (4 × 10 km relay: 1987, 1989; 50 km: 1991, 1993), three silvers (15 km, 30 km: both 1989; 4 × 10 km relay: 1991), and two bronzes (50 km: 1987, 10 km: 1991). He won the overall World Cup in 1986–87, and ended five times in the top three overall.

He competed for the club Åsarna IK throughout his career. Mogren received the Svenska Dagbladet Gold Medal in 1993.

He retired from cross-country skiing following the 1997–98 season. Since retiring, he has been working as a sales representative for Swedish tap manufacturer FM Mattsson, one of his sponsors during his active career. He has been Swedish Radio's main biathlon and cross-country skiing expert commentator since 2003, covering the Olympics and World Championships.

Cross-country skiing results
All results are sourced from the International Ski Federation (FIS).

Olympic Games
 1 medal – (1 gold)

World Championships
 9 medals – (4 gold, 3 silver, 2 bronze)

World Cup

Season titles
 1 title – (1 overall)

Season standings

Individual podiums
13 victories
37 podiums

Team podiums
 11 victories – (11 ) 
 29 podiums – (28 , 1 ) 

Note:  Until the 1999 World Championships and the 1994 Winter Olympics, World Championship and Olympic races were included in the World Cup scoring system.

References

External links

1963 births
Living people
People from Hällefors Municipality
Swedish male cross-country skiers
Cross-country skiers at the 1984 Winter Olympics
Cross-country skiers at the 1988 Winter Olympics
Cross-country skiers at the 1992 Winter Olympics
Cross-country skiers at the 1994 Winter Olympics
Cross-country skiers at the 1998 Winter Olympics
Olympic gold medalists for Sweden
Olympic medalists in cross-country skiing
FIS Nordic World Ski Championships medalists in cross-country skiing
FIS Cross-Country World Cup champions
Åsarna IK skiers
Medalists at the 1988 Winter Olympics
Olympic cross-country skiers of Sweden